Hla Oo (born 14 October  1957) is a Burmese politician and currently serves as an Amyotha Hluttaw MP for Sagaing Region No. 4 constituency. He is a member of the National League for Democracy.

Early life and education
Hla Oo was born on 14 October 1957 in Myinmu Township, Myanmar. He graduated with B.A(Q) from Mandalay University in 1979. He has served as municipal department accountability of Monywa Township and also a Senior lawyer.

Political career
He is a member of the National League for Democracy. In the 2015 Myanmar general election, he was elected as an Amyotha Hluttaw MP, winning a majority of 325481 votes and elected representative from Sagaing Region No. 4 parliamentary constituency.

References

Living people
1957 births
National League for Democracy politicians
People from Sagaing Region
Mandalay University alumni